Lawrence Sargent Hall (1915–1993) was an American author.

Career
In 1936, Hall received his BA from Bowdoin College in Brunswick, Maine. In 1941, he received his Ph.D. in English from Yale University. In 1942, he was chief of an Office of Strategic Services (OSS) censorship unit. He taught at several educational institutions, including Deerfield Academy and Yale. In 1946, he retired as a US Navy Reserve lieutenant commander. From 1946 to 1986, he taught English at Bowdoin.  In 1956, he was a Carnegie visiting professor at Columbia University. From 1964, he was chairman of the Bowdoin Department of English. In 1986, he retired as Henry Leland Chapman professor. He was an active advocate of the arts in Maine.

His short story, The Ledge, won first place in the 1960 O. Henry Prize Collection, and has appeared in more than 30 anthologies.  His novel, Stowaway received the 1962 William Faulkner Award for best debut novel.  He contributed to several journals including The Hudson Review.

Published works

 Hawthorne: Critic of Society (1943)
 The Ledge (1959)
 Stowaway (1961)
 How Thinking Is Written (1963)
 Seeing And Describing (1966)
 A Grammar of Literary Criticism (2011)

References

External links
http://library.bowdoin.edu/arch/mss/lshg.shtml
http://www.enotes.com/lawrence-sargent-hall-salem/lawrence-sargent-hall

20th-century American novelists
American male novelists
1915 births
1993 deaths
O. Henry Award winners
Bowdoin College alumni
Bowdoin College faculty
American male short story writers
20th-century American short story writers
20th-century American male writers
Novelists from Maine